The Israel Medical Association Journal is a monthly peer-reviewed medical journal published by the Israel Medical Association. It was established in 1999, replacing the Israel Journal of Medical Sciences. The editor-in-chief is Yehuda Shoenfeld.

See also 
 Health care in Israel

References

External links 
 

English-language journals
Medicine in Israel
Publications established in 1999
General medical journals
Monthly journals
1999 establishments in Israel